KFOH-LP (99.3 FM) is a radio station licensed to serve the community of Saint Joseph, Missouri. The station is owned by St. Joseph Music Foundation. It airs a variety format.

The station was assigned the KFOH-LP call letters by the Federal Communications Commission on June 9, 2014.

References

External links
 Official Website
 

FOH-LP
FOH-LP
Radio stations established in 2014
2014 establishments in Missouri
Variety radio stations in the United States
Buchanan County, Missouri